Morph the Cat is the third studio album by American singer-songwriter Donald Fagen. Released on March 7, 2006, to generally positive reviews from critics, Morph the Cat was described by Fagen as his "death album" in an interview with Fred Kaplan of The New York Times. Musicians on the album include drummer Keith Carlock, saxophonist Walt Weiskopf, bassist Freddie Washington, and guitarists Frank Vignola, Jon Herington, Wayne Krantz, and Hugh McCracken.

Morph the Cat was released on CD and on a CD/DVD-Audio 2-disc package, with a 5.1 surround sound mix engineered by Elliot Scheiner. The surround recording won the Grammy Award for Best Surround Sound Album.

Track listing
All songs written by Donald Fagen.

Personnel
 Donald Fagen - Lead vocals, backing vocals, Fender Rhodes (2, 4, 9), piano (6-7), organ (6), melodica (8)
 Jerry Barnes - Backing vocals (1, 5, 9)
 Michael Harvey - Backing vocals (1, 6, 9)
 Amy Helm - Backing vocals (3)
 Carolyn Leonhart - Backing vocals (3, 8)
 Cindy Mizelle - Backing vocals (3)
 Frank Vignola - Guitar (1), guitar tag solo (9)
 Hugh McCracken - Guitar (1-3, 9)
 Wayne Krantz - Guitar (1-3, 6-9), guitar solo (4-5)
 Jon Herington - Guitar (3-8), guitar solo (2, 9), guitar chorus solo (9)
 Ken Emerson - Guitar (3)
 Freddie Washington - Bass (1-3, 5-9)
 Brian Montgomery - Remedial bass (9)
 Harlan Post, Jr. - Acoustic bass (7)
 Keith Carlock - Drums
 Ted Baker - Piano (2), Wurlitzer Electric Piano (3, 6), Fender Rhodes (7, 8)
 Walt Weiskopf - Tenor saxophone (1-2, 7, 9)
 Lawrence Feldman - Tenor saxophone (4-5)
 Roger Rosenberg - Baritone saxophone (2, 4, 5), bass clarinet (7)
 Marvin Stamm - Trumpet (1, 2, 4, 5, 7, 9)
 Mark Patterson - Trombone (4, 5, 7)
 Lawrence Feldman - Flute (7)
 Illinois Elohainu - Flute (8)
 Howard Levy - Harmonica (3, 7)
 Phonus Quaver - Marimba (4), vibraphone (1, 5, 8, 9)
 Gordon Gottlieb - Percussion (2, 4, 6, 7)
 Bashiri Johnson - Percussion (4)
 Joe Pasaro - Percussion (5)
 Camille Meza, Candice Predham, Eddie Jackson, Jennifer Battista - Handclaps (6)

 * Harlan Post Jr., Phonus Quaver and Illinois Elohainu are pseudonyms for Fagen himself when he plays an instrument sample patch on a synthesizer trying to replicate the actual instrument.

Production
 Producer: Donald Fagen
 Tracking Engineer: Elliot Scheiner
 Overdub/ProTools Engineers: Brian Montgomery, T. J. Doherty
 Mix Engineer: Elliott Scheiner
 Second Mix Engineer: Brian Montgomery
 Assistant Engineers: Eddie Jackson, Jim Keller, Chad Lupo, Steve Mazur, Brian Montgomery, Matt Scheiner, Bryan Smith, Allan "A.T." Thomas
 Piano Technicians: Sam Berd, Wayne Williams
 Drum/Guitar Tech: Artie Smith
 Music Copyist: Gary Blu
 Mastering Engineer: Darcy Proper
 Additional Mastering: Joseph M. Palmaccio
 Mastering Assistant: Maria Triana
 Management: Irving Azoff
 Production Coordinators: Jill Dell'Abate, Cindy Osborne
 Production Assistant: Mary Lou Arnold
 Art Direction: Jeri Heiden
 Design: Ryan Corey
 Photography: Danny Clinch

Charts
Album

Singles

References

External links
Donald Fagen interview in Sound on Sound - Article by Paul Tingen about the making of Morph The Cat

Donald Fagen albums
2006 albums
Albums produced by Donald Fagen
Reprise Records albums
Grammy Award for Best Immersive Audio Album